The Redmi 10 5G is a 5G Android-based smartphone developed by Redmi, a sub-brand of Xiaomi Inc. Was introduced 29 March 2022 with Redmi Note 11S 5G and global version of Redmi Note 11 Pro+ 5G. Earlier in China Redmi 10 5G was released with Redmi Note 11E Pro as Redmi Note 11E. and later it was released in India with Redmi 11 Prime and Redmi A1 as Redmi 11 Prime 5G with other front camera.

Redmi 10 5G was launched under the POCO brand as Poco M4 5G (stylized and marketed as POCO M4 5G) with different designs and a primary camera. The Indian variant of Poco M4 5G has more advanced cameras.

In China global Poco M4 5G is sold as Redmi Note 11R with Ice Crystal Galaxy (silver) color option instead POCO Yellow and a bigger memory configuration.

Design 
The front is made of Gorilla Glass 3. The back is made of plastic with a wavy texture.

The design of Redmi 10 5G/Note 11E and Redmi 11 Prime 5G back is similar to Oppo smartphones, when in Poco M4 5G/Note 11R it is similar to Pixel 6. Also, all models have IP53 dust and splash protection.

On the bottom side there are USB-C port, speaker and microphone. On the top side there are additional microphone, IR blaster and 3.5mm audio jack. On the left side there is dual SIM tray with microSD slot. On the right side are a volume rocker and power button with a mounted fingerprint scanner.

Redmi 10 5G sells in 3 colors: Graphite Gray, Chrome Silver and Aurora Green.

Redmi Note 11E sells in 3 colors: Mysterious Darkness (gray), Ice Crystal Galaxy (silver) and Microbrewed Mint (green).

Redmi 11 Prime 5G sells in 3 colors: Thunder Black, Chrome Silver and Meadow Green.

Poco M4 5G sells in 3 colors: Power Black, Cool Blue and POCO Yellow.

Redmi Note 11R sells in 3 colors: Polar Blue Ocean, Mysterious Darkness (gray) and Ice Crystal Galaxy (silver).

Specifications

Hardware

Platform 
Smartphones have, like Redmi Note 10 5G, MediaTek Dimensity 700 with Mali-G57 MC2.

Battery 
Devices have non-removable battery with capacity 5000 mAh and 18 W fast charging.

Camera 
All models have dual rear camera with 50 MP,  on Redmi 10 5G/Note 11E, Redmi 11 Prime 5G and Indian Poco M4 5G and 13 MP  on global Poco M4 5G/Note 11R wide camera plus 2 MP,  depth sensor. Redmi 10 5G/Note 11E and Poco M4 5G have 5 MP, Indian Poco M4 5G has 8 MP,  and Redmi 11 Prime 5G has 8 MP,  front camera. Rear and front camera can record video in 1080p@30fps.

Display 
Phones have 6.58" IPS LCD display with Full HD+ (2408 × 1080; ~401 ppi) image resolution, 90 Hz refresh rate and waterdrop notch.

Memory 
Redmi 10 5G solds with 4/64, 4/128 and 6/128 GB, Redmi Note 11E ― 4/128 and 6/128 GB, Redmi 11 Prime 5G and Poco M4 5G ― 4/64 and 6/128 GB, and Redmi Note 11E ― 4/128, 6/128 and 8/128 GB.

All models have LPDDR4X type of RAM and type of storage UFS 2.2 which could be extanded by microSD up to 1 TB in global Poco M4 5G/Redmi Note 11R and up to 512 GB in other models.

Software 
Initially, Redmi 10 5G/Note 11E, Redmi 11 Prime 5G, and Redmi Note 11R were released with MIUI 13 custom skin, and Poco M4 5G was released with MIUI 13 for POCO. Both based on Android 12.

See also 
 Redmi 10
 Redmi Note 10
 Redmi Note 11

References

External links 
 
 
 
 
 
 

Android (operating system) devices
Phablets
10 5G
Mobile phones with multiple rear cameras
Mobile phones with infrared transmitter
Mobile phones introduced in 2022